Nemo Bahari (born 23 March 1975) is an Indonesian boxer. He competed in the men's featherweight event at the 1996 Summer Olympics.

References

External links
 

1975 births
Living people
Indonesian male boxers
Olympic boxers of Indonesia
Boxers at the 1996 Summer Olympics
Place of birth missing (living people)
Asian Games medalists in boxing
Boxers at the 1994 Asian Games
Asian Games bronze medalists for Indonesia
Medalists at the 1994 Asian Games
Featherweight boxers
20th-century Indonesian people